The 1962 Lower Hutt mayoral election was part of the New Zealand local elections held that same year. The elections were held for the role of Mayor of Lower Hutt plus other local government positions including fifteen city councillors, also elected triennially. The polling was conducted using the standard first-past-the-post electoral method.

Background
The incumbent Mayor, Percy Dowse, sought re-election for a fifth term. Dowse was opposed by the deputy mayor George Llewellyn Barker who stood as an independent candidate. Just as in the previous two elections the Citizens' Association did not stand an official ticket of candidates and endorsed a slate of independents. The Ratepayer Independents lost all but three seats with the Labour Party regaining their majority on the council. The main issue of the previous election was the council's finances with Dowse criticised over a ₤75,000 loan for the second stage of the Maungaraki development. Since then the financial situation had been evaluated and the City Treasurer's report in April 1961 established that the council's accounts were healthy with the Ratepayer Independents criticisms being over-exaggerated. This news helped Dowse and Labour make a strong comeback in the election.

Mayoral results

Councillor results

Notes

References

Mayoral elections in Lower Hutt
1962 elections in New Zealand
Politics of the Wellington Region